N-Nitrosodiethylamine (NDEA) is an organic compound with the formula Et2NNO (Et = C2H5).  A member of the nitrosamines, it is a light-sensitive, volatile, clear yellow oil that is soluble in water, lipids, and other organic solvents. It has an amine or aromatic odor. It is used as gasoline and lubricant additive, antioxidant, and stabilizer for industry materials. When heated to decomposition, N-nitrosodiethylamine emits toxic fumes of nitrogen oxides. N-Nitrosodiethylamine affects DNA integrity, probably by alkylation, and is used in experimental research to induce liver tumorigenesis. It is carcinogenic and mutagenic. NDEA has also been found to perturb amino acid biosynthesis including arginine, as well as DNA damage repair and mitochondrial genome maintenance in yeast.

It is found in tobacco smoke.

It is classified as a Group 2A carcinogen (probable human carcinogen) by the World Health Organization.

NDEA involvement in recalls 
In the year 2019, NDEA was found as an impurity in valsartan and other angiotensin II receptor blockers (ARBs) used to treat high blood pressure and heart failure. The U.S. Food and Drug Administration has confirmed levels of NDEA and/or NDMA exceeding the interim acceptable intake limits, and the affected medicines were recalled.

References

Hepatotoxins
Nitrosamines